= Himachal Pradesh Rural Cricket League =

- Sport: Twenty20 Cricket
- Abbreviation: HPRCL
- Founded: 2011
- Affiliation: Indian Premier Corporate League
- Affiliation date: January-2011
- Affiliation date: 2011
- Location: Shimla, HP, India
- Secretary: Shri Narinder Verma

Official website
- www.hprcl20.com

The Himachal Pradesh Rural Cricket League (HPRCL) is a Twenty20 Cricket League. Founded in 2011, HPRCL is associated with the Indian Premier Corporate League and Indian Twenty20 Cricket Federation, and aims to provide a platform for talented but poor cricket players from rural and remote areas.

Shri Narinder Verma is the First Director of the Himachal Pradesh Rural Cricket League.
